Liminal States is a novel by Zack Parsons, published in March 2012. The story principally follows two men, Warren Groves and Gideon Long, who become immortal in 1874 through a process they don't fully understand. Over the course of three sections, set in 1874, 1951 and 2006, the story follows their lives across an increasingly divergent alternate history America.

As part of the build-up to the novel's release, Parsons also published a related serial, "The Reificant," following an alien's encounter with the same form of immortality.

Plot

The novel contains three main sections: The Builder, The Judge and The Mother, which are respectively a western, noir and science fiction/horror. They are separated by two shorter sections and supplemented by "The Reificant".

"The Reificant" and The Champion 

"The Reificant" serial was published in chapters between February 2 and March 23, 2012 on Something Awful, where Parsons was also a regular writer. The serial remains available to read there and at liminalstates.com.

The story starts on an alien world and is narrated from the point of view of a native being that identifies itself as the Champion. The Champion is an enormous grasshopper-like defender of a "spire," a colony analogous to an insect nest. The Champion is to defend its spire and queen from attacks by other queens in other spires. The Champion experiences confusion when it is defeated by one of these swarms. Instead of having it slain, the queen, in an act of mockery, has the Champion drowned in an unusual pool of white liquid.

This act begins a cycle of unwilling rebirth for the Champion, which is reborn first on its home world, then on a series of alien worlds. Everywhere it emerges from the same strange waters, and the Champion realizes the pools are somehow connected, and involved in the fall of each world. Sometimes the Champion is reincarnated as itself, but other times it takes the form of whatever local life has been put into the pools.

Arriving on Earth, the Champion encounters Puebloans in the age before European contact. It eventually learns their language and is accepted among them. Believing that the danger of their pool can be stopped if the pool is sealed, it convinces them to give it gold, which it uses to coat a large rock as a barrier against the corrosive waters of the pool. When the pool is covered, it kills them with their consent, in the hope that they will not be reborn again. It then goes to a place they have prepared for it and commits suicide. The Champion and at least one of the Puebloans are reborn in an abandoned alien structure on yet another world, and the Champion realizes it was unsuccessful. It fights various other beings brought forth by the pool.

After an unclear amount of time, the seal on the Earth pool fails, and the Champion, which now identifies itself as "reificant", is reborn there again as a local animal. It emerges from the Pueblo canyon to find men constructing a railroad. Intending to go and warn them, it is instead killed by other creatures from the pool. The serial ends with the Champion undeterred in its mission.

The Champion also narrates the opening pages of Liminal States in a section also called The Champion and captioned "before and after", in which it continues its warning of the dangers of the water.

The Builder (1871)

In the fictional town of Spark, New Mexico, Warren Groves is sheriff and his wife, Annie, is about to give birth to their first child. Gideon Long, the son of a local copper magnate, covets Annie and believes he can win her away from Warren. Gideon is a poor money manager and is concealing the company's financial troubles from his dying father, the tyrannical Harlan Long. Harlan treats Gideon with contempt and believes him inferior to his deceased brother, Harlan II, who died in the American Civil War.

In an attempt to save his fortunes, Gideon orchestrates a train robbery that goes disastrously wrong. Left dying in the desert, Gideon is led by strange animals to the pool the Champion tried and failed to seal. Believing its waters to be potable, Gideon tries to drink from the pool. The water's extreme properties melt his flesh, and he falls into it, briefly dying.

He finds himself reborn seemingly moments later, along with the limp form of a man whose blood had gotten onto his clothes. His gold teeth and the shell of his pocket watch are all that survive of Gideon's old form. He deduces that the pool can only fully restore someone who was alive when they fell in, and that the waters cannot dissolve gold.

Not fully understanding his rebirth, Gideon returns to Spark, where he is devastated to discover that Annie Groves has died. He confronts Warren Groves, who kills him, causing him to be reborn again from the pool. Gideon kidnaps Warren and takes him to the pool, where he throws Warren in, punishing him to live forever.

The two begin a bloody feud in which Warren chases down Gideon and kills him over and over. Eventually realizing that this isn't working, Warren prepares to dynamite the pool. He stops when a second copy of Gideon emerges from the pool.

The Covenant (1890)

Nineteen years later, the five living Gideons and the four living Warrens meet in secret and agree to the terms of a covenant. Among the terms are that each new copy will take a new name, abandon all aspects of his old life, and avoid contact with the other clones.

The terms of the covenant are to be enforced by a Warren, who will be chosen by Harlan Bishop (a Gideon) or one of his descendants. After the covenant is agreed to and signed, Harlan appoints as the first judge a Warren just then emerging from the pool.

The Judge (1951)

Unlike the rest of the novel, this section of the novel is in the first person. The narrator is Casper Cord, who has lived at least 11 previous lives. In his current life, he is a veteran of World War II and the judge of the covenant. Formerly a cop with the Los Angeles Police Department, he is now a private investigator.

At the beginning of his story, he arrives at the scene of a crime. The body of a woman who looks exactly like Annie Groves has been found on the side of the road, holding a piece of paper with Casper's name and phone number on it. Casper privately vows to get to the bottom of what happened to the woman.

Casper visits a doctor about a persistent cough and learns he has cancer. This is probably connected to his time spent fighting on the Home Islands of Japan. In the story's version of World War II, which Casper occasionally revisits through flashbacks, the war lasted until 1948. The Japanese refused to surrender in the face of sustained nuclear attack, and Casper was sent in with the American ground forces.

Harlan Bishop, introduced in The Covenant, is still alive but in a state of advanced old age. He is grooming a successor Gideon, Ethan Bishop, to take over the vast business empire he has amassed. Casper doesn't fully trust the Gideons, but is also distrustful of his own clone line, believing that the Warrens are prone to dangerous and destructive behavior.

The Mother (2006)

Characters

Warren Groves
Born to Abraham Nunn

Gideon Long

Annabelle Groves

née Moraud

Harlan Long

Reception

References

2012 American novels
Alternate history novels
American science fiction novels
Citadel Press books